The twelfth season of Supernatural, an American dark fantasy television series created by Eric Kripke, premiered on October 13, 2016, on The CW and concluded on May 18, 2017. The season consisted of 23 episodes and aired on Thursdays at 9:00 pm (ET) for the first 8 episodes before moving to 8:00 pm (ET) in January 2017. This is the first season with Andrew Dabb and Robert Singer as showrunners. The season follows Sam and Dean dealing with the resurrection of their mother while trying to stop Lucifer from creating a Nephilim, while also being the target of a faction called The British Men of Letters.

Cast

Starring
 Jared Padalecki as Sam Winchester
 Jensen Ackles as Dean Winchester
 Mark A. Sheppard as Crowley
 Mark Pellegrino as Lucifer
 Misha Collins as Castiel

Special guest star
 Rick Springfield as Vincent "Vince" Vincente / Lucifer

Special appearance by
Jim Beaver as Bobby Singer

Guest stars

Episodes

Production
Supernatural was renewed for a twelfth season by The CW on March 11, 2016. The twelfth season is the final season to feature Mark A. Sheppard as Crowley as the actor announced in May 2017 he would not be returning for season 13.

Reception
The review aggregator website Rotten Tomatoes currently reports a 100% approval rating for Supernaturals twelfth season, with an average rating of 8.48/10 based on 10 reviews. The critics consensus reads, "Twelve seasons in, Supernatural still finds ways to entertain, forging new paths bound to lead to fresh adventures ahead for the Winchester brothers."

Ratings

Notes

References

External links

Supernatural 12
2016 American television seasons
2017 American television seasons